Atlantic Jaxx Recordings: A Compilation is a compilation of select releases on English electronic music duo Basement Jaxx's Atlantic Jaxx label from 1994 to 1997. Most of the tracks are written or produced by Basement Jaxx, excluding "Belo Horizonti", which is a Basement Jaxx remix of the song by The Heartists.

"Fly Life" was a huge hit throughout the international club scene and a top twenty hit in Basement Jaxx's native Britain.

Atlantic Jaxx Recordings: A Compilation was followed two years later by the first full-length album of original Jaxx material, Remedy.

Track listing

References 

Basement Jaxx albums
Record label compilation albums
1997 compilation albums